This is a calendar of name days in Hungary.

January
 Fruzsina
 Ábel
 Genovéva, Benjámin
 Titusz, Leona
 Simon
 Boldizsár
 Attila, Ramóna
 Gyöngyvér
 Marcell
 Melánia
 Ágota
 Ernő 
 Veronika
 Bódog
 Lóránt, Loránd
 Gusztáv
 Antal, Antónia
 Piroska
 Sára, Márió
 Fábián, Sebestyén
 Ágnes
 Vince, Artúr
 Zelma, Rajmund
 Timót
 Pál (or Paul)
 Vanda, Paula
 Angelika
 Károly, Karola
 Adél
 Martina, Gerda
 Marcella

February
 Ignác
 Karolina, Aida
 Balázs
 Ráhel, Csenge
 Ágota, Ingrid
 Dorottya, Dóra
 Tódor, Rómeó
 Arankaia
 Abigél, Alex
 Elvira
 Bertold, Marietta
 Lídia, Lívia
 Ella, Linda
 Bálint, Valentin
Kolos, Georgina
 Julianna, Lilla
 Donát
 Bernadett
 Zsuzsanna
 Aladár, Álmos
 Eleonóra
 Gerzson
 Alfréd
 Mátyás
 Géza
 Edina
 Ákos, Bátor
 Elemér

March
 Albin
 Lujza
 Kornélia
 Kázmér
 Adorján, Adrián
 Leonóra, Inez
 Tamás
 Zoltán
 Franciska, Fanni
 Ildikó
 Szilárd
 Gergely, Athan
 Krisztián, Ajtony
 Matild
 Kristóf
 Henrietta
 Gertrúd, Patrik
 Sándor, Ede
 József, Bánk
 Klaudia
 Benedek
 Beáta, Izolda, Lea
 Emőke
 Gábor, Karina
 Irén, Írisz
 Emánuel
 Hajnalka
 Gedeon, Johanna
 Auguszta
 Zalán,
 Árpád

April
 Hugó
 Áron
 Buda, Richárd
 Izidor
 Vince
 Vilmos, Bíborka
 Herman
 Dénes
 Erhard
 Zsolt
 Leó, Szaniszló
 Gyula
 Ida
 Tibor
 Anasztázia, Tas
 Csongor
 Rudolf
 Andrea, Ilona
 Emma
 Tivadar
 Konrád
 Csilla, Noémi
 Béla
 György
 Márk
 Ervin
 Zita
 Valéria
 Péter
 Katalin, Kitti

May
 Fülöp, Jakab
 Zsigmond, Idir
 Tímea, Irma
 Mónika, Flórián
 Györgyi
 Ivett, Frida
 Gizella
 Mihály
 Gergely
 Ármin, Pálma, Ajna 
 Ferenc
 Pongrác
 Szervác, Imola
 Bonifác
 Zsófia, Szonja
 Mózes, Botond
 Paszkál
 Erik, Alexandra
 Ivó, Milán
 Bernát, Felícia
 Konstantin
 Júlia, Rita
 Dezső
 Eszter, Eliza
 Orbán
 Fülöp, Evelin
 Hella
 Emil, Csanád
 Magdolna
 Janka, Zsanett
 Angéla, Petronella

June
 Tünde
 Kármen, Anita
 Klotild, Cecília
 Bulcsú, Jason
 Norbert, Cintia
 Róbert
 Medárd
 Félix
 Margit, Gréta
 Barnabás
 Villő
 Antal, Anett
 Vazul
 Jolán, Vid, Ariana
 Jusztin
 Laura, Alida
 Arnold, Levente
 Gyárfás
 Rafael
 Alajos, Leila
 Paulina
 Zoltán
 Iván
 Vilmos
 János, Pál
 László
 Levente, Irén
 Péter, Pál 
 Pál

July
 Tihamér, Annamária, Amika
 Ottó
 Kornél, Soma
 Ulrik
 Emese, Sarolta, Sara
 Csaba, Jeba
 Apollónia
 Ellák
 Lukrécia
 Amália
 Nóra, Lili
 Izabella, Dalma
 Jenő
 Örs, Stella
 Henrik, Roland, Örkény
 Valter
 Endre, Elek, Dzsesszika
 Frigyes
 Emília
 Illés
 Daniel, Daniella
 Magdolna
 Lenke, Brigitta
 Kinga, Kincső
 Kristóf, Jakab
 Anna, Anikó
 Olga, Liliána
 Szabolcs
 Márta, Flóra
 Judit, Xénia
 Oszkár

August
 Boglárka
 Lehel
 Hermina
 Domonkos, Dominika
 Krisztina
 Berta, Bettina
 Ibolya
 László
 Emőd
 Lőrinc
 Zsuzsanna, Tiborc
 Klára
 Ipoly
 Marcell
 Mária
 Ábrahám
 Jácint
 Ilona
 Huba
 István
 Sámuel, Hajna
 Menyhért, Mirjam
 Bence
 Bertalan
 Lajos, Patrícia
 Izsó
 Gáspár
 Ágoston
 Beatrix, Erna
 Rózsa
 Bella, Erika

September
 Egyed, Egon
 Rebeka, Dorina
 Hilda
 Rozália
 Viktor, Lőrinc
 Zakariás
 Regina
 Mária, Adrienn
 Ádám
 Nikolett, Hunor
 Teodóra
 Mária
 Kornél
 Szeréna, Roxána
 Enikő, Melitta
 Edit
 Zsófia
 Diána
 Vilhelmina
 Friderika
 Máté, Mirella
 Móric
 Tekla, Líviusz
 Gellért, Mercédesz
 Eufrozina, Kende
 Jusztina
 Adalbert
 Vencel
 Mihály, Miguel
 Jeromos

October
 Malvin
 Petra
 Helga
 Ferenc
 Aurél
 Brúnó, Renáta
 Amália
 Koppány
 Dénes
 Gedeon
 Brigitta
 Miksa
 Kálmán, Ede
 Helén
 Teréz
 Gál
 Hedvig
 Lukács
 Nándor
 Vendel
 Orsolya
 Előd
 Gyöngyi
 Salamon
 Blanka, Bianka, Mór
 Dömötör
 Szabina
 Simon, Szimonetta
 Nárcisz
 Alfonz
 Farkas

November
 Marianna
 Achilles
 Győző
 Károly
 Imre
 Lénárd Nuno
 Rezső
 Zsombor
 Tivadar Nátán
 Réka
 Márton
 Jónás, Renátó
 Szilvia
 Aliz
 Albert, Lipót
 Ödön
 Hortenzia, Gergő
 Jenő
 Erzsébet
 Jolán
 Olivér
 Cecília
 Kelemen, Klementina
 Emma
 Katalin
 Virág
 Virgil
 Stefánia
 Taksony
 András, Andor

December
 Elza
 Melinda, Vivien
 Ferenc, Elias
 Borbála, Barbara
 Vilma
 Miklós
 Ambrus
 Mária
 Natália
 Judit
 Árpád, Árpádina
 Gabriella
 Luca, Otília
 Szilárda
 Valér
 Etelka, Aletta
 Lázár, Olimpia
 Auguszta
 Viola
 Teofil
 Tamás
 Zénó
 Viktória
 Ádám, Éva
 Eugénia
 István
 János
 Kamilla
 Tamás, Tamara
 Dávid
 Szilveszter

External links
  Sortable Hungarian name days list - this is a sortable list allowing one to list alphabetically or chronologically
  Hungarian name day search engine with expanded name database - Search by date, name or nickname

Hungary
Namedays
Festivals in Hungary